The Singapore Floorball Association (SFA) is the governing body of floorball in Singapore. The SFA was established in 1995 and became a member of the International Floorball Federation in the same year.

Competitions organised
Singapore Floorball League
Men
Division 1
Division 2
Conference
Women
Division 1
Division 2
Pesta Sukan Floorball Cup
National Floorball Challenge

School tournaments
Primary Schools (Junior and Senior)
'C' Division Boys and Girls
'B' Division Boys and Girls
'A' Division Boys and Girls
IVP
POL-ITE

References

External links
 

Floorball governing bodies
Floorball in Singapore
Floorball
1995 establishments in Singapore
Sports organizations established in 1995